Gary McDonald (born 1961, London) is an English actor of Jamaican descent. A student at Elliott school in Putney, McDonald played football for Wimbledon FC under Dario Gradi.

He was a member of the Royal Court Theatre from 1979 to 1980, appearing in various plays at the Court such as Hard time Pressure, Hero's Welcome, and Che Walker's Been so Long. In the 1980s he performed with the Talawa Theatre company in The Black Jacobins, The Importance of Being Earnest, and A Raisin in the Sun with the Black Theatre. He appeared at the Royal National Theatre in Macbeth, Black Poppies, and Rhapsody in Black & White and at The Cottlesloe  in Blood Wedding.   Other theatre credits include Scrape of the Black and Mike Leigh's It's a Great Big Shame at the Theatre Royal Stratford East.

His first notable television role came in 1987 when he was cast as Darren Roberts in the BBC soap opera EastEnders. He left the role in 1988. He has also appeared in Numb3ers, The Bill, Between the Lines, South of the Border, as Captain John Black in Dream Team (1999–2006) and in Brothers and Sisters, among others. He has appeared in various films.

Filmography
Death in Paradise as Temmy Verga, episode 5.4 (2016)
Titanfall (2014) Video game
The Shepherd: Border Patrol (March 4, 2008)
Numb3rs - (2005) TV
The Basil Brush Show (2003)
Wondrous Oblivion (2003) .... Gary Sobers
Casualty (2003, 2007)
Murder in Mind - Favours (2003) .... Det. Const. Jed Culshaw
Babyfather - (2002) .... Kevin
Doctors - "Testing Testing" (2002) .... PC Aidan Brown
Fields of Gold (2002) (TV) .... Johnson
All or Nothing (2002) .... Neville
The Bill (2002) .... Ronnie Jackson / (1999) .... Steve Bryant
Out (2001) .... John
Brothers and Sisters (1998).... Wycliffe Leonard
The Spanish Prisoner (1997) .... Ticket Agent
Secrets & Lies (1996) .... Boxer
Thief Takers (1996) .... DC Alan Oxford
Bliss (1995) (TV) .... Gee
Mrs. Hartley and the Growth Centre (1995) (TV) .... Gary
What You Lookin' At? (1993) TV Series .... Linford
Love Hurts - "Band of Gold" (1993) TV Episode .... Dennis
Between the Lines - "Breaking Point" (1992) TV Episode .... P.C. Cameron
Young Soul Rebels (1991) .... Davis
Struck by Lightning (1990)
Shooting Stars (1990) .... Calvin
EastEnders (1985) TV Series .... Darren Roberts (1987–1988)
Top Kids (1987) (TV)
London's Burning: The Movie (1986) (TV) .... Ethnic
Outbreak of Hostilities (1982) (TV)

References

External links

1961 births
Living people
English male soap opera actors
Male actors from London
Black British male actors
English male film actors
21st-century English male actors
20th-century English male actors